Harlem-Eddy Gnohéré (born 21 February 1988) is a French professional footballer who plays as a striker.

Nicknamed "the Bison" due to his strong body frame, Gnohéré started his career as a junior in native France, and went on to compete in Switzerland, Belgium and Romania.

He represented in the latter country rival teams Dinamo București and FCSB, and became the top scorer of the domestic league in the 2017–18 season. The Gazeta Sporturilor daily also named him Foreign Player of the Year twice in a row for his individual performances in Romania.

Club career

Dinamo București
On 16 July 2015, Gnohéré signed a two-year contract with Romanian top-flight team Dinamo București. He was previously announced as the player of Petrolul Ploiești, but was quickly released because he was deemed overweight. He scored his first goal for Dinamo in his second league match, a 2–1 victory over ACS Poli Timișoara on 3 August.

On 22 November 2015, Gnohéré netted in a derby against FC Steaua București, which Dinamo won 3–1. After the departure of Cosmin Matei in the winter transfer window, he took over his number 10 jersey. On 17 May 2016, Gnohéré scored in the Cupa României final against CFR Cluj, but his side eventually lost the game 4–5 at the penalty shootout. He ended the campaign with 41 appearances and 18 goals all competitions comprised.

Gnohéré's second season began on 23 July 2016, with a league match against defending champions Astra Giurgiu; he scored a hat-trick and provided an assist in the 4–1 away win. In early September, it was reported that FCSB wanted to sign the striker. Shortly after, he refused to extend his contract with Dinamo and was sent to play for the reserve team in the third league for an undetermined period. Gnohéré was however recalled to the first team after less than a month. His last goal was netted from the penalty spot on 26 November 2016 in a Liga I game with FC Voluntari.

FCSB

In January 2017, after reaching his final six months of contract with Dinamo, Gnohéré moved to FC Steaua București—later renamed FCSB—for an undisclosed transfer fee. He therefore became the first foreigner to have played for the two cross-town rivals.

On 19 October 2017, Gnohéré recorded his first European goals after netting twice in a 2–1 UEFA Europa League group stage away victory over Hapoel Be'er Sheva. Three days later, he scored a hat-trick in a 7–0 away victory at ACS Poli Timișoara. Gnohéré scored the only goal of a Europa League round of 32 first leg match against Italian team Lazio, on 15 February 2018. He also scored in the second leg at the Stadio Olimpico.

Gnohéré became the first player outside Romania to net for both Steaua/FCSB and Dinamo in the Eternal derby, after opening the scoring in a 3–3 league draw on 29 July 2018. On 31 March 2019, he scored the winner in a 3–2 victory over CS Universitatea Craiova, which was his fiftieth goal in the first division.

On 4 June 2020, FCSB announced the termination of Gnohéré's contract, almost three months after being placed on technical unemployment because of the COVID-19 pandemic. He departed as the club's top foreign goalscorer in the Liga I with 41 goals, as well as the championship's third-best foreign goalscorer overall with 58 goals.

He returned to Belgian club Mouscron on July 20, 2020 for free.

Personal life
Born in France, Gnohéré is of Ivorian descent. Gnohéré's brother, Arthur, was also a footballer. He too played for several clubs in France and Switzerland.

Career statistics

Club

Honours
Charleroi
Belgian Second Division: 2011–12

Dinamo București
Cupa României runner-up: 2015–16

FCSB București
Cupa României: 2019–20

Individual
Gazeta Sporturilor Foreign Player of the Year in Romania: 2017, 2018
DigiSport  Liga I Player of the Month: September 2015, October 2017
UEFA Europa League Player of the Week: 20 October 2017
Liga I top scorer: 2017–18
Liga I Team of the Season: 2017–18, 2018–19

References

External links

1988 births
Living people
Footballers from Paris
French footballers
French sportspeople of Ivorian descent
Association football forwards
AS Cannes players
ES Troyes AC players
Urania Genève Sport players
Belgian Pro League players
Challenger Pro League players
R.E. Virton players
R. Charleroi S.C. players
K.V.C. Westerlo players
Royal Excel Mouscron players
R.A.E.C. Mons players
Liga I players
FC Dinamo București players
FC Steaua București players
French expatriate footballers
Expatriate footballers in Belgium
French expatriate sportspeople in Belgium
Expatriate footballers in Switzerland
French expatriate sportspeople in Switzerland
Expatriate footballers in Romania
French expatriate sportspeople in Romania